Noel Francis Kelly (17 December 1930September 1991) was an Australian horse trainer. 

Kelly was born in Ballarat, Victoria, and started out as a potato farmer and truck driver. In 1969 Kelly built a stable complex at Dowling Forest Racecourse, Ballarat.

In 1974 Kelly advised the owners of Frozen Section that he had set the horse to win The Metropolitan in Sydney and Citadel to win the other leg of the feature double, the Epsom Handicap. The group of owners and friends backed the double to win $2 million. The Epsom Handicap, on the Saturday, was won by Citadel at 100–1. On the Monday, Frozen Section took a forward position in The Metropolitan and forged to the lead on the home turn, only to be beaten in the last stride by Passetruel. Frozen Section never raced again.

Noel Kelly died in September 1991, aged 60.

References

Australian racehorse trainers
1930 births
1991 deaths